Come Fly with Me is a British mockumentary television comedy series created by and starring Matt Lucas and David Walliams. Narrated by Lindsay Duncan, the series launched on 25 December 2010 on BBC One. A spoof of British documentaries Airport and Airline, the series follows the activity at a major airport and three fictional airlines: low-cost British airline FlyLo (a parody of Flybe, Ryanair, easyJet), low-cost Irish airline Our Lady Air (a parody of Ryanair and Aer Lingus), and major British airline Great British Air (a parody of British Airways).

Lucas and Walliams portray many of the focal airline and airport staff, as well as some passengers, whose comments and experiences are featured in one or more of the series episodes in the style of a "fly on the wall documentary". Despite announcing a second series, Walliams confirmed in January 2013 that a second series would not air, after Lucas refused to make a second series and the show was cancelled indefinitely.

Production
In June 2010, it was announced that Little Britain stars Lucas and Walliams had reunited to star in a new comedy series set in an airport, a spoof of British documentaries Airport and Airline. Filming for Come Fly with Me began in August, with the duo spending two weeks at Robin Hood Airport Doncaster Sheffield. A further three weeks were spent shooting at London Stansted Airport, with scenes also being filmed at Liverpool John Lennon Airport and Pinewood Studios. A "making of" documentary titled Come Fly on the Wall aired on BBC One on 8 February 2011. On 28 January 2011, the BBC announced it had commissioned a second series, but Walliams confirmed in January 2013 that a second series was not going to air.

Airlines
FlyLo is a low-cost, no frills airline owned by Omar Baba. Providing service across Europe and selected destinations across the Atlantic and South East Asia, it uses many hidden charges and unorthodox schemes in order to cut costs. These include £1 flights to New York City with a £480 booking fee, upright flatbeds in economy class, and a very small hand baggage allowance. FlyLo also offers budget package holidays that do not go down very well with its passengers.
Our Lady Air is an Irish low-cost airline, providing routes across Europe. It saves money by flying to airports further away from the actual city centre, such as landing a flight to Barcelona in Ireland. Our Lady Air offers business class, in-flight meals, and no hidden charges.
Great British Air (callsign: Swiftbird) is a major British flag carrier airline, providing a high class service around the world from the United Kingdom. The airline is renowned for having the finest first-class service in the world, with champagne and chocolates on boarding, and well-cooked meals on long haul flights. On short-haul flights, both first and economy class passengers are given a complimentary small glass of fresh orange juice and The Daily Mail.

Characters

Main characters
 Omar Baba (Walliams) – The double-chinned, flamboyantly asinine Arab owner of low-cost airline FlyLo. Baba is a parody of the Greek-Cypriot "low-cost flying" entrepreneur Stelios Haji-Ioannou (the founder of easyJet).
 Precious Little (Lucas) – A Jamaican woman in her 50s who professes to be a devout Christian, she is the manager of the airport's coffee kiosk. Precious deliberately causes problems that force the closure of the kiosk, allowing her to take the day off. Her main catchphrase is shouting "praise the Lord!"
 Moses Beacon (Walliams) – The gushing, effeminate executive passenger liaison officer for Great British Air. Moses also runs a charity called WishWings which supposedly funds holidays for sick children, but usually involves Moses simply using the money to enjoy the local gay nightlife, leaving the child in the hotel or even at home. His catch phrase is "if you'll pardon the pun" when he has not made a pun.
 Ian Foot (Walliams) – The pompous, racist, and bigoted chief immigration officer who often comes up with ridiculous reasons not to allow a foreign person into the country, which includes people such as the Polish ambassador to the United Kingdom.
 Tommy Reid (Lucas) – A young, obtuse Scottish man working at Happy Burger, one of the airport's fast-food eateries. He hopes to work his way up to becoming a pilot, unaware that the two jobs are completely unrelated.
 Taaj Manzoor (Lucas) – Taaj is a young British-Pakistani man who works as part of the roving ground crew for FlyLo. He sports a shaved head and a chin curtain beard.
 Melody Baines (Walliams) and Keeley St Clair (Lucas) – Two snarky check in girls for FlyLo who hail from Liverpool. Later on in the series, the girls fight for the position of check-in manager and it is later revealed that Keeley got the job, only to lose it when Omar replaces his whole staff with children to cut costs.
 Mickey Minchin (Lucas) and Buster Bell (Walliams) – Two shady paparazzi who haunt the airport's hallways, constantly messing up in their photo-shooting activities.
 Fearghal O'Farrell (Lucas) – A homosexual air steward for Irish airline Our Lady Air, who leads a destructive campaign in order to become Employee of the Year.
 Ben Roberts (Walliams) and James Stewart (Lucas) – Two British airport customs officers, with rather extreme methods of cataloguing the illegal substances they find, such as sampling drugs.
 Simon (Lucas) and Jackie Trent (Walliams) – A husband and wife pilot team, flying for Great British Air. Jackie constantly brings up the fact that Simon committed adultery with a stewardess, which is the reason they now fly together.
 Peter (Lucas) and Judith Surname (Walliams) – Married holidaymakers who have suffered several horrific and surreal trips abroad after buying destination packages from FlyLo, dubbing them "The holiday from Hell". Peter is forced to take a subordinate stance to Judith's overbearing personality and is usually silenced by her. They have had many unfortunate events on their travels, such as a cruise where they contract a disease and then have pirates attack the ship, surviving a plane crash in Peru and having to eat Peter's leg to survive, a holiday to Cyprus to a hotel that hasn't been built yet, and visiting a small African island where they are kidnapped by a local tribe. Despite the traumatic nature of these experiences, they usually relate the stories in a calm, deadpan tone, as if they were a collection of minor inconveniences. In the final episode, Peter leaves Judith and returns to his last destination, where he was hypnotised into having sex with an entire tribe of women.
 Penny Carter (Walliams) – A very elitist first-class stewardess for Great British Air's long haul flights who despises people who have first class tickets but are not upper-class.
 John (Lucas) and Terry (Walliams) – Father-and-son baggage handlers who steal from passengers' luggage and are generally less than careful with it. Their name is a reference to controversial footballer John Terry.
 Helen Baker (Sally Rogers) – The check-in staff manager for FlyLo who later goes on maternity leave.
 Lisa (Pippa Bennett-Warner) – Check-in staff for FlyLo. She receives several complaints from regular FlyLo passengers, Peter and Judith.

Additional characters 
 Hetty Wolf (Lucas) – A 92-year-old passenger who pretends to be on her first flight, scamming Moses Beacon into buying her a number of luxury products, including an Yves Saint Laurent scarf and an iPad, and getting her a seat in first class, before revealing she has flown many times before. 
 Sue (Lucas) and Geoff Stott (Walliams) – A couple who are flying to Disneyland to get married. 
 Asuka and Nanako (Walliams & Lucas) – Two Japanese girls who have flown to the airport to see their idol, Martin Clunes. 
 Geri Halliwell (herself) - whose photo resident paparazzi Mickey and Buster are waiting to take as she disembarks a plane, only to miss the shot as they're too busy comparing the virtues of each of the Spice Girls to camera. 
 Mrs. Mumbutu (Ellen Thomas) – Liberian passenger whom Ian accuses of making up her country. 
 Ashley (Walliams) – The supervisor who is there to help Tommy serve his first customer at Happy Burger.
 Lee Lodge (Walliams) – Trainee steward for Our Lady Air. He has a girlfriend and is heterosexual, but has homosexual intercourse with Fearghal whilst in a hotel in Dublin. 
 Captain Stirrick (Ted Robbins) – A drunk airline pilot who causes a commotion. 
 David Schwimmer (himself) – Stopped by customs whilst trying to smuggle transsexual porn DVDs into the UK, which he blames on his Friends co-stars Matt LeBlanc and Jennifer Aniston. 
 Mr Akhmed (Stewart Scudamore) – A Muslim passenger that orders the halal meal option on the flight to Rome, but instead was given the kosher meal (intended for a Jewish passenger) by Fearghal. .
 Trainee (Joe Cole) - Taking a customer's order under the supervision of Tommy Reid at Happy Burger 
 Rupert Grint (himself) – Taaj gives Rupert his script for Future Cop 2000 when meeting him whilst he disembarked the plane from Los Angeles. Taaj asks Grint to pass it on to Daniel Radcliffe. .
 The Woods Family – A family who turn up for their flight a week early. They stay at the airport for a week, then end up missing their flight. 
 Kenneth (Lucas) – A border-patrol worker who instantly recognizes Ian Foot in disguise. 
 Barbara Windsor (herself) – Moses is asked to escort Barbara to her departure gate, but actually wants her to help him get a knighthood or an OBE. In the guise of an autograph, he even gives her an insulting letter to sign addressed to the Queen. Windsor is offended after reading the letter and she tells Moses to "piss off." 
 Steve Downes (Lucas) – A police dog handler whose previous canine companions have mostly ended up in rehab. His current drug sniffer dog is called Bobo. 
George Spires (Lucas) – A Welsh toilet cleaner who is a fan of opera singing and sings to the people who come in. 
Colin (Walliams) and Gavin (Lucas) – Battle re-enactors who are not allowed to take swords to a re-enactment of the Battle of Agincourt; Colin later says he has killed only three people in the trade. 
'Mr Nuts' (Alex MacQueen) – A passenger of Our Lady Air who suffers from a nut allergy. Fearghal appears to save him from dying, but Fearghal had actually induced the reaction himself by discreetly dropping a handful of hot nuts into his mouth on his way past in order to appear heroic. 
Corinne Oliver (Walliams) – The airport's officer of special needs. She is disabled herself and is pushed around by her helper, Bob (Lucas). 
Flying School Instructor (Walliams) – Employee for the BAC who interviews Tommy Reid for the chance to become a pilot. 
Ray (Walliams) and Anne Wilkins (Lucas) – Owners of the airport pub. They are known to chase departing customers through the airport in a bid for someone to stay "more than twelve minutes". 
Mary O'Mara (Aisling Bea) – Air stewardess for Irish airline Our Lady Air, who wins the Steward of the Year title in a draw with Fearghal O'Farrell. 
Dale Winton (himself) – The host of Our Lady Air's annual Steward of the year competition. 
Mr Dubrowski (Valentine Pelka) – The Polish Ambassador to the United Kingdom, whom Ian Foot accuses of working illegally in the United Kingdom because he is Polish.
George Allen (himself) - A baggage handler for Great British Air.

Episodes

Series 1 (2010–2011)
Series 1 of Come Fly with Me began airing on Christmas Day 2010 to mixed reviews from critics, and gained over 12.47 million viewers. The second episode, which aired on New Year's Day 2011, gained over 8.80 million viewers, while the remaining four episodes averaged around 7 million viewers throughout the rest of the series. The series began airing in the United States on BBC America on 18 June 2011, edited to fit a 30-minute time slot with commercials.

Come Fly on the Wall (2011)
Come Fly on the Wall discussed the making of Come Fly with Me with Walliams and Lucas. The programme featured clips from filming, outtakes and interviews with the show's creators as they developed the series. It featured pre production discussions and rehearsals, and showed the actors filming at some of the United Kingdom's busiest airports. It also showed Walliams and Lucas transforming into their new characters in the make up chair, and bringing them to life in front of the camera.

The programme was broadcast on BBC One on 8 February 2011.

Cancellation
On 28 January 2011, BBC announced that the show had been commissioned for a second series. The new series was set to air during early 2013. In January 2013, Walliams confirmed that a second series would not air, stating that Lucas did not wish to continue the show.

Home media

Digital Editions were released on Amazon Prime Video and iTunes / Apple TV.

Web content
In conjunction with the television episodes, a selection of extra online content was published on the programme website. The extra content, featuring some of the main characters played by Matt Lucas and David Walliams, was presented as spoof versions of real life airline websites, for example an on line check in service for fictional airline FlyLo, with Melody and Keeley. The content was written by Kevin Cecil, who also contributed to the television scripts. Cecil was inspired by his own work on comedy tie in books over the years.

Reception
Come Fly with Me received mixed reviews, with the Daily Express calling it "the worst sketch show, or sitcom to have ever gone out on a Christmas Day" and expressed concern over its screening on the day, considering the perceived lack of quality. The Daily Mirror, however, claimed it was a resounding success and the claims of racism and lack of humour made by the Express were unfounded and hypocritical.
The show was the most watched comedy of 2010, with ten million viewers, but also had thousands of viewer complaints, and criticism for perceived racist content. It was the third most-watched show on Christmas Day in the United Kingdom.

Controversy
In June 2020, Come Fly with Me, alongside Little Britain, was removed from Netflix for its use of blackface, brownface and yellowface; six months prior it had also been removed from BritBox. It had not been available on iPlayer. A spokesperson for the BBC said: "There’s a lot of historical programming available on BBC iPlayer, which we regularly review". On its decision to remove the shows, BritBox added: "Times have changed since Little Britain first aired, so it is not currently available on BritBox. Come Fly With Me has not been available on the service for six months".

Ratings

International versions

A Dutch version of the show was created, using an almost exact copy of the script and characters (translated to Dutch). It was broadcast on RTL 4 from August 2011.

References

External links

2010s British comedy television series
2010 British television series debuts
2011 British television series endings
Aviation television series
BBC television comedy
BBC television sketch shows
British mockumentary television series
English-language television shows
Race-related controversies in television